The 4th Independent Spirit Awards, honoring the best in independent filmmaking for 1988, were announced on March 25, 1989 at the Hollywood Roosevelt Hotel in Los Angeles. It was hosted by Buck Henry.

Winners and nominees

Films with multiple nominations and awards

Films that received multiple nominations

Films that won multiple awards

Special awards

Friends of Independence Award

 The National Coalition of Independent Public Broadcasting Producers

References

External links
1988 Spirit Awards at IMDb
Full show on Film Independent's official YouTube channel

1988
Independent Spirit Awards